Raymond "Boz" Burrell (1 August 1946 – 21 September 2006) was an English musician. Originally a vocalist and guitarist, Burrell is best known for his singing with King Crimson (1971–1972) and bass playing in Bad Company (1973–1982, 1998–1999). He died of a heart attack in Spain on 21 September 2006, aged 60.

Career

Early years
Raymond Burrell was born on 1 August 1946 in Holbeach, Lincolnshire. As a teen in the 1950s, he began playing rhythm guitar for the Tea Time 4, a group formed with his school pals Bernie Rudd and Brian Rocky Browne. They both acquired a passion for jazz and enjoyed acts such as Mose Allison, John Coltrane, and Charles Mingus. The group had several personnel changes and moved to London in 1965 at the suggestion of manager, Jack Barrie. With the addition of Ian McLagan on keyboard and a name change to Boz People, the group secured a contract with EMI's Columbia label.

Burrell's style leaned more towards jazz, whereas McLagan was into Booker T, four singles being recorded and backing band slots with Kenny Lynch and Elkie Brooks. However, with little commercial success McLagan soon left to join The Small Faces.

Burrell next enjoyed a short stint in the soul band, Feel For Soul, back in Norwich from 1966 until the following year. In late 1965, Burrell was briefly considered to replace Roger Daltrey in The Who.

Between 1966 and 1968 Burrell released six singles in Britain on the Columbia label under the name Boz, including a cover of "I Shall be Released", backed by "Down in the Flood" (wrongly named "Dove in the Flood" on the label), both written by Bob Dylan. On this he was joined by organist Jon Lord, guitarist Ritchie Blackmore and drummer Ian Paice, who formed Deep Purple at the same time, and bassist Chas Hodges, later of Chas and Dave fame. Burrell later appeared on Centipede's 1971 recording Septober Energy.

King Crimson

In 1971 Burrell joined King Crimson as the new vocalist, having met Robert Fripp while both were performing with Centipede. After a last minute let down from new bassist Rick Kemp, Boz (who had only limited guitar-playing ability) was installed as the band's bass player with Fripp and Ian Wallace teaching him to play rather than start the search again.

The band toured and recorded the band's fourth studio album, Islands (1971), a warmer sounding release and the band's only string ensemble experimentation. Tensions began socially on tour and creatively with the direction of the group's latest effort. This led to lyricist Peter Sinfield being ousted following the band's next tour. During rehearsals in early 1972 the band fell apart with all members leaving due to creative restrictions imposed by Fripp as a "quality control" measure.

The band members were convinced to rejoin and fulfil their touring commitments for that year with the intention of disbanding thereafter. Recordings from this subsequent tour exist as the live compilation, Earthbound (1972), and as a large part of the box set Sailors' Tales (1970–1972) (2017), which contains studio and live recordings spanning Burrell's entire tenure in the band. Although relations improved between both parties leading to an offer from the musicians to continue on in the band, Fripp had already moved on and declined to participate.

In 1973 Burrell, Wallace and Mel Collins reunited with Sinfield for his solo effort, Still. They also went on to form Snape with CCS's Alexis Korner and Peter Thorup, who had been on tour with King Crimson in the states the previous year, releasing the studio album, Accidentally Born in New Orleans, and a live album, Live on Tour in Germany. In 1974 Burrell featured with Chapman Whitney Streetwalkers along with other members of Family and King Crimson.

Bad Company

Burrell was a founding member of the supergroup Bad Company, formed in 1973 along with ex-Mott the Hoople guitarist  Mick Ralphs and two former members of Free: vocalist Paul Rodgers and drummer Simon Kirke. The band debuted with the self-titled Bad Company in 1974 which eventually went Platinum, as did the 1975 follow-up, Straight Shooter and 1976's Run with the Pack.

1977's Burnin' Sky proved less successful, but the group's fifth release in 1979, Desolation Angels, saw the band once again return to platinum status. Rough Diamonds, the final studio album featuring the original members, released in 1982, was the worst-selling album in this incarnation and the band soon after split.

Using the name Bad Company, Ralphs and Kirke continued to play together, but it was not until 1998 that Burrell rejoined his bandmates along with Rodgers for a reunion tour, recording four new songs and releasing the compilation The 'Original' Bad Co. Anthology. Burrell left the band in 1999 along with Ralphs.

Later work
In January 1981, Burrell joined Roger Chapman again for his solo band, The Shortlist, leaving in 1983. He returned in May 1987, but left again the following year in June. In 1982, Burrell contributed to Jon Lord's solo album, Before I Forget, on the track "Hollywood Rock and Roll", and in 1984 he joined the short-lived Nightfly.

In the 1990s, Burrell worked with such acts as Alvin Lee for his Best of British Blues tour of 1996 and Ruby Turner. During this period, his main creative outlet was with the Scottish blues singer Tam White. Their collaboration developed into a trio known as The Shoe String Band and a big band, the Celtic Groove Connection. White was present at Burrell's apartment in Spain when Burrell suddenly died of a heart attack during rehearsals, on 21 September 2006.

Discography

solo as Boz
 "Isn't That So" / "You're Just the Kind of Girl I Want" (11 Feb 1966) (single)
 "Meeting Time" / "No (Ah) Body Knows Blues" (7 Apr 1966) (single)
 "Pinocchio" / "Stay as You Are" (10 Jun 1966) (single)
 "The Baby Song" / "Carry on Screaming" (29 Jul 1966) (single)
 "I Shall Be Released" / "Down in the Flood" (3 May 1968) (single)
 "Light My Fire" / "Back Against the Wall" (16 Aug 1968) (single)

with Duster Bennett
 Jumpin' at Shadows (1965)

with Centipede
 Septober Energy (1971)

with King Crimson
 Islands (1971)
 Earthbound (1972)
 Ladies of the Road (2002)
 Sailors’ Tales (1970 – 1972), 27-disc boxed set (2017)

with Pete Sinfield
 Still (1973)

with Snape
 Accidentally Born in New Orleans (1973) 
 Live on Tour in Germany (1973) 

with Bad Company

 Bad Company (1974)
 Straight Shooter (1975)
 Run with the Pack (1976)
 Burnin' Sky (1977)
 Desolation Angels (1979)
 Rough Diamonds (1982)
 10 from 6 (1985)
 The 'Original' Bad Co. Anthology (1999)
 Live in Albuquerque 1976 (2006)

with Boxer
 Bloodletting (1979)

with Jon Lord
 Before I Forget (1982) Track 3 – "Hollywood Rock and Roll"

with The Shortlist 
 He Was... She Was... You Was... We Was... (1982)
 Mango Crazy (1983)
 Riff Burglar (The Legendary Funny Cider Sessions – Vol. 1) (1988)

with Ken Hensley
 From Time to Time (1994)

with Ruby Turner
 Call Me by My Name (1998)

with Celtic Groove Connection
 Celtic Groove Connection (1999)

Notes

References
 Eur.International Who's Who in Popular Music. Volume 4. Edition4. Routledge (2002) 
 Fletcher, Tony. Moon: The Life and Death of a Rock Legend. HarperCollins (2000). 
 George-Warren Holly, Romanowski Patricia, Pareles Jon. The Rolling stone Encyclopedia of Rock & Roll. Edition 3 (revised). Fireside (2001) 
 Hjort, Christopher. Strange Brew: Eric Clapton & the British blues boom, 1965–1970. Jawbone Press (2007) 
 Various. Mojo, Issues 154–157. EMAP Performance (2006). Original from the University of Virginia (digitised 22 January 2010)
 Neill Andrew, Kent Matthew, Daltrey Roger, Stamp Chris. "Anyway, Anyhow, Anywhere: The Complete Chronicle of the Who 1958–1978". Sterling Publishing Company (2009). 
 Various. The Wire, Issues 197–202. The Wire (2000). Original from the University of Virginia. Digitized (16 February 2010)

External links
 
 
 Boz Burrell discography, album releases & credits at Discogs

1946 births
2006 deaths
English male singers
English rock singers
English male guitarists
Male bass guitarists
English rock bass guitarists
English rock guitarists
English blues guitarists
English blues singers
English tenors
Blues rock musicians
King Crimson members
Bad Company members
People from Lincoln, England
Musicians from Lincolnshire
English expatriates in Spain
Centipede (band) members
20th-century English bass guitarists
Streetwalkers members
21st-century English bass guitarists
20th-century British male singers
Deaths from heart disease